Polistes stigma is a species of paper wasp from Southeast Asia. It is primarily cursorial. There is a distinct yellow band on the abdomen. The terminal end of the nest is whitish in between greyish color. It's probably because the larva before pupation extends the cell wall & milky white end towards the top surface of the nest and then the larva seals it.This  process is not seen in Ropalidia marginata.

References

External links
 
 

stigma
Insects described in 1793